Juan Artola Canales (born 7 April 2000) is a Spanish professional footballer who plays as a right winger for Burgos CF, on loan from Athletic Bilbao.

Club career
Artola was born in Bilbao, Biscay, Basque Country, and joined Athletic Bilbao's youth setup in 2010, from Romo FC. He made his senior debut with the farm team in the 2018–19 season, in Tercera División.

Artola made his debut for the reserves on 8 September 2019, coming on as a second-half substitute for Oier Zarraga in a 2–5 Segunda División B away loss against Cultural y Deportiva Leonesa. He scored his first goals for the side six days later, netting a brace in a 4–0 home routing of Salamanca CF UDS.

On 26 March 2021, Artola renewed his contract with the Lions until 2025. In June, he was called up by manager Marcelino to make the pre-season with the main squad.

Artola made his first team debut for the Lions on 6 January 2022, playing the last 14 minutes in a 2–0 away win over Atlético Mancha Real, for the season's Copa del Rey. On 7 July, he was loaned to Segunda División side Burgos CF for the season.

Artola made his professional debut on 14 August 2022, starting and scoring the winner in a 1–0 home success over Málaga CF.

References

External links

2000 births
Living people
Footballers from Bilbao
Spanish footballers
Association football wingers
Segunda División players
Segunda División B players
Tercera División players
CD Basconia footballers
Bilbao Athletic footballers
Athletic Bilbao footballers
Burgos CF footballers